Officer 666 may refer to:
 Officer 666 (1916 film), a  silent film made in Australia
 Officer 666 (1920 film), an American silent comedy film